Bartolomé Torre (1512–1568) was a Roman Catholic prelate who served as Bishop of Islas Canarias (1566–1568).

Biography
Bartolomé Torre was born in 1512.
On 15 May 1566, he was appointed during the papacy of Pope Pius V as Bishop of Islas Canarias.
He served as Bishop of Islas Canarias until his death on 1 February 1568 in the Castillo de la Luz, Las Palmas, Spain.

References

External links and additional sources
 (for Chronology of Bishops)
 (for Chronology of Bishops)

16th-century Roman Catholic bishops in Spain
Bishops appointed by Pope Pius V
1512 births
1568 deaths